Dashtabad (also Romanized as Dashtābād) is a village in Tork-e Sharqi Rural District, Jowkar District, Malayer County, Hamadan Province, Iran. At the 2006 census, its population was 621, in 137 families.

References 

Populated places in Malayer County